A crème liqueur is a liqueur that has a great deal of additional sugar added to the point that it has a near-syrup consistency. Unlike cream liqueurs, crème liqueurs include no cream in their ingredients. "Crème" in this case refers to the consistency. This category includes crème de cacao (chocolate), crème de menthe (mint), crème de mûre (blackberry), and crème de cassis (black currant).

See also
List of liqueurs

References

Liqueurs